Alvin John Paddock (born June 9, 1954) is a Canadian professional ice hockey coach and former player, currently the senior vice-president of hockey operations of the Regina Pats of the Western Hockey League (WHL). He is a former head coach of the Winnipeg Jets and Ottawa Senators. During his long career in the American Hockey League (AHL), he won five Calder Cup championships (two as a player, three as a head coach) and was inducted into the AHL's Hall of Fame in 2010.

Playing career
Selected in the 1974 NHL Entry Draft by the Washington Capitals, Paddock only played eight games with the Capitals before he was traded to the Philadelphia Flyers. He played a memorable role in the 1980 Stanley Cup Finals against the New York Islanders, scoring the tying goal to send Game 6 of the Finals into overtime. However, Bob Nystrom scored at 7:11 of overtime to win the Stanley Cup for New York.

Throughout his career, Paddock had a difficult time trying to crack the lineup on an NHL team.  Playing primarily in the minors, in particular the Maine Mariners of the American Hockey League (AHL), Paddock retired as a player in 1983–84 and moved to coaching.

Career statistics

Coaching career
Paddock began coaching with the Maine Mariners of the AHL, winning the Calder Cup in his first year. He later coached in Hershey, Pennsylvania, winning the Calder Cup as coach of the 1988 AHL champion Hershey Bears.  He was named head coach of the NHL's Winnipeg Jets in 1991, becoming the first Manitoba-born coach of the franchise. Later, he would also become its general manager and would relinquish his coaching duties in early 1994.  He remained as the general manager—even after the Jets relocated to Phoenix, Arizona, to become the Phoenix Coyotes—until December 1996.

After two years as a scout with the New York Rangers, Paddock would return to head coaching in 1999, primarily in the AHL. He was head coach of the Hartford Wolf Pack from 1999 to 2002, winning his third AHL Championship as a coach in the 1999–2000 season.

Paddock joined the Ottawa Senators organization in 2002 as coach of their AHL affiliate, the Binghamton Senators, from 2002 to 2005. In 2002, he was promoted to the assistant coach of the Ottawa Senators. When Ottawa head coach Bryan Murray was promoted to general manager in July 2007 following the team's Stanley Cup Finals appearance, Paddock became head coach of Ottawa, the sixth head coach in modern Senators' history.

Paddock's term with Ottawa started extremely well. In the first 17 games of the season, the club set records for the best start in NHL history, winning 15 of their first 17 games. In the 2007–08 season, Paddock was the head coach of the Eastern Conference team for the All-Star game as Ottawa had the best record in the East. However, on February 27, 2008, Murray fired Paddock after several lackluster performances by the team in February, and a generally poor record since the first 17 games of the year. Murray would serve as head coach for the remainder of the 2007–08 season and playoffs, with a 7–9–2 record. The Senators were eliminated in the first round of the playoffs.

In August 2008, Paddock returned to the Philadelphia Flyers organization, hired to be head coach of their AHL affiliate, the Philadelphia Phantoms. On July 9, 2009, he was appointed assistant general manager of the Flyers. On June 18, 2014, Paddock was released by the Philadelphia Flyers organization.

On August 6, 2014, Paddock was hired by the Western Hockey League (WHL)'s Regina Pats as head coach and senior vice-president of hockey operations. Following his first season behind the Pats' bench, Paddock was named the Dunc McCallum Trophy winner as the WHL's 2015 Coach of the Year.

On June 28, 2018 he stepped down as head coach but remained VP of Hockey Operations and GM for The Pats.

References

External links
 
Profile at hockeydraftcentral.com

1954 births
Arizona Coyotes executives
Brandon Wheat Kings players
Canadian ice hockey coaches
Canadian ice hockey forwards
Hershey Bears coaches
Ice hockey people from Manitoba
Living people
Maine Mariners players
Minnesota Fighting Saints draft picks
National Hockey League general managers
New York Rangers scouts
Ottawa Senators coaches
Philadelphia Flyers coaches
Philadelphia Flyers executives
Philadelphia Flyers players
Quebec Nordiques players
Regina Pats coaches
Richmond Robins players
Springfield Indians players
Washington Capitals draft picks
Washington Capitals players
Winnipeg Jets (1972–1996) coaches
Winnipeg Jets (1972–1996) executives